List of schools in Edinburgh is a list of schools in the City of Edinburgh council area of Scotland. It lists schools both within Edinburgh itself, and in outlying villages within the local government boundary.

State schools

Primary schools

Within Edinburgh 

Abbeyhill Primary School
Balgreen Primary School
Blackhall Primary School
Bonaly Primary School
Broomhouse Primary School
Broughton Primary School
Brunstane Primary School
Bruntsfield Primary School
Buckstone Primary School
Bun-sgoil Taobh na Pàirce
Canaan Lane Primary School 
Canal View Primary School
Carrick Knowe Primary School
Castleview Primary School
Clermiston Primary School
Clovenstone Primary School
Colinton Primary School
Corstorphine Primary School
Craigentinny Primary School
Craiglockhart Primary School
Craigour Park Primary School
Craigroyston Primary School
Cramond Primary School
Dalry Primary School
Davidson's Mains Primary School
Duddingston Primary School
East Craigs Primary School
Ferryhill Primary School
Flora Stevenson Primary School
Forthview Primary School
Fox Covert Primary School
Frogston Primary School
Gilmerton Primary School
Gracemount Primary School
Granton Primary School
Gylemuir Primary School
Hermitage Park Primary School
Holy Cross RC Primary School, Newhaven
James Gillespie's Primary School
Juniper Green Primary School
Leith Primary School
Leith Walk Primary School
Liberton Primary School
Longstone Primary School
Lorne Primary School
Murrayburn Primary School
Niddrie Mill Primary School
Oxgangs Primary School
Parsons Green Primary School
Pentland Primary School
Pirniehall Primary School
Preston Street Primary School
Prestonfield Primary School
Roseburn Primary School
The Royal High Primary School
Royal Mile Primary School
Sciennes Primary School
Sighthill Primary School
South Morningside Primary School
St Andrew's Fox Covert RC Primary, Corstorphine
St Catherine's RC Primary School, Liberton
St Cuthbert's RC Primary School, Slateford
St David's RC Primary School, Pilton
St Francis' RC Primary School, Niddrie
St John Vianney RC Primary School, Inch
St John's RC Primary School, Portobello
St Joseph's RC Primary School, Broomhouse
St Mark's RC Primary School, Oxgangs
St Mary's RC Primary School, Bonnington
St Mary's RC Primary School, Leith
St Ninian's RC Primary School, Restalrig
St Peter's RC Primary School, Morningside
Stenhouse Primary School
Stockbridge Primary School
Tollcross Primary School
Towerbank Primary School
Trinity Primary School
Victoria Primary School
Wardie Primary School

Outwith Edinburgh 

Currie Primary School, Currie
Dalmeny Primary School
Dean Park Primary School, Balerno
Echline Primary School, South Queensferry
Harmeny Education Trust, Balerno
Hillwood Primary School, Ratho Station
Kirkliston Primary School
Nether Currie Primary School, Currie
Newcraighall Primary School
Queensferry Primary School, South Queensferry
Ratho Primary School
St Margaret's RC Primary School, South Queensferry

Secondary schools

Within Edinburgh 

Boroughmuir High School
Broughton High School
Castlebrae Community High School
Craigmount High School
Craigroyston Community High School
Drummond Community High School
Firrhill High School
Forrester High School
Gracemount High School
Holyrood High School Edinburgh
James Gillespie's High School
Leith Academy
Liberton High School
Portobello High School
The Royal High School
St Augustine's High School
St Thomas of Aquin's High School
Trinity Academy, Edinburgh
Tynecastle High School
Wester Hailes Education Centre

Outwith Edinburgh 
Balerno Community High School
Currie High School
Queensferry High School, South Queensferry

Special schools

Within Edinburgh 

Braidburn Special School
Cairnpark School
Kaimes School
Kingsinch School
Oaklands Special School
Pilrig Park School
Prospect Bank School
Rowanfield School
Royal Blind School
St Crispin's School

Independent schools

Within Edinburgh
Cargilfield Preparatory School (co-ed, day and boarding)
Dunedin School
The Edinburgh Academy (co-ed, day school, all ages)
Edinburgh Rudolf Steiner School
Fettes College (co-ed, all ages, day and boarding)
George Heriot's School (co-ed, day school, all ages)
George Watson's College (co-ed, day school, ages)
Erskine Stewart's Melville Junior School (co-ed)
The Mary Erskine School (girls, senior)
Merchiston Castle School (boys, day and boarding, ages 7–18)
Regius Christian School
The Royal Blind School
St George's School (girls, day and boarding, all ages)
St Mary's Music School (specialist music, co-ed)
Stewart's Melville College (boys, day and boarding, senior)

Outwith Edinburgh 
Clifton Hall School, Newbridge (co-ed, day school, all ages)

References
 Information as of February 2006 compiled from website UK Schools & Colleges Database, which lists current state (and some independent) schools by council, and also links to websites of individual schools where available.

 
Edinburgh
Sch